Laxmi Hazaria (born 10 August 1937) is an Indian cricketer. He played in twenty-three first-class matches for Uttar Pradesh from 1959/60 to 1972/73. The Laxmi Hazaria XI cricket team competes in domestic tournaments in India.

See also
 List of Uttar Pradesh cricketers

References

External links
 

1937 births
Living people
Indian cricketers
Uttar Pradesh cricketers
Sportspeople from Kanpur